South Wanatah is an unincorporated community in Cass Township, LaPorte County, Indiana.

History
South Wanatah was once called Roselle. Roselle was platted in 1859. It lies south of Wanatah, Indiana, hence the present name.

Geography

References

Unincorporated communities in LaPorte County, Indiana
Unincorporated communities in Indiana